Filip Trojan (born 21 February 1983) is a Czech former professional footballer who played as a midfielder. He coaches Dynamo Dresden's U-14 side.

Club career
On 20 March 2009, Trojan signed for the 1. FSV Mainz 05 who had been newly promoted to the Bundesliga.

International career
Trojan represented Czech Republic youth teams.

Honours
Schalke 04
UEFA Intertoto Cup: 2003

References

External links
 
 
 

1983 births
Living people
Czech footballers
Association football midfielders
Czech Republic youth international footballers
Czech Republic under-21 international footballers
FC Schalke 04 players
FC Schalke 04 II players
VfL Bochum players
FC St. Pauli players
1. FSV Mainz 05 players
MSV Duisburg players
Dynamo Dresden players
Bundesliga players
2. Bundesliga players
Czech expatriate footballers
Czech expatriate sportspeople in Germany
Expatriate footballers in Germany
Sportspeople from Třebíč